Neom (styled NEOM;) is a planned smart city in Tabuk Province in northwestern Saudi Arabia. The site is north of the Red Sea, east of Egypt across the Gulf of Aqaba, and south of Jordan. The city's plans include multiple regions, including a floating industrial complex, global trade hub, tourist resorts, and a linear city—all powered exclusively by renewable energy sources.  

Developers intend for the majority of the city to be complete by 2030. Experts have expressed skepticism about the ambitions of the megaproject. Saudi Arabia originally aimed to complete major parts of the project by 2020, with an expansion completed in 2025, but then fell behind schedule.  By July 2022, only two buildings had been constructed, and most of the project area remained bare desert. 

The project's estimated cost is over $500 billion. On January 29, 2019, Saudi Arabia announced that it had set up a closed joint-stock company named Neom. The company is wholly owned by the Public Investment Fund, and is solely dedicated to developing the economic zone of Neom.

Etymology
The name "Neom" is a portmanteau. The first three letters form the Ancient Greek prefix νέο Neo- meaning "new". The fourth letter, M, is representative of both the first letter of Saudi Crown Prince Mohammed bin Salman's name and the first letter of the Arabic word for "future".

History
Saudi Crown Prince Mohammed bin Salman announced the plans for the city at the Future Investment Initiative conference in Riyadh, Saudi Arabia, on October 24, 2017. He said it would operate independently from the “existing governmental framework” with its own tax and labour laws and an "autonomous judicial system." Egypt announced in 2018 that it would contribute some land to the Neom project.

Klaus Kleinfeld was announced as the inaugural director for the Neom project upon its launch by Muhammed bin Salman. In 2018, Kleinfeld signed Gladstone Place Partners LLC for "Communications Services" for the Neom project, for a fee of $199,500 plus expenses of $45,000. On July 3, 2018 Kleinfeld was announced as the new advisor to Muhammed bin Salman from 1 August 2018 onwards. Nadhmi Al-Nasr succeeded him as the new Director of Neom from 1 August 2018.

The initiative to create the city of Neom emerged from Saudi Vision 2030, a plan to reduce Saudi Arabia's dependence on oil, diversify its economy, and develop public service sectors. Plans call for robots to perform functions such as security, logistics, home delivery, and caregiving and for the city to be powered solely with wind and solar power.

The first phase of the project is scheduled for completion by 2025.

Planned regions

The Line
  
The design for The Line was further modified in July 2022, scrapping the original idea for multiple buildings on a linear plan, instead combining the buildings into one continuous structure with an entirely glass mirror exterior. The car-free city is planned to be large enough to house 9 million residents within walkable communities, with all basic services within a 5-minute walking distance.

Neom Bay
The development work of the project's first phase, Neom Bay, was planned to start in the first quarter of 2019 and be completed by 2020. The developments were to include constructing the airport at Sharma which would operate regular commercial flights between Riyadh and Neom. The plan of Neom Bay's developments also involves building the first residential area in Neom as part of phase 1.

Neom Bay Airport 

The airport that is planned to be located at Neom Bay has been registered by the International Air Transport Association (IATA) with the code NUM.

Oxagon
Oxagon (originally named Neom Industrial City) is a floating industrial complex shaped like an octagon. The project will focus on modern manufacturing, industrial research, and development centered on expanding the Duba port. Mohammed bin Salman expects Oxagon to become "a new focal point for global trade flows" and service shipping routes through the Red Sea. The plans for the complex include a desalination plant, a hydrogen plant, and an oceanographic research center. It will also be home to the cognitive multinational company Tonomus (originally NEOM Tech & Digital Company), which is the first subsidiary company to evolve from NEOM.

On December 16, 2022, Saudi Arabia's Ministry of Industry and Mineral Resources, the Saudi Authority for Industrial Cities and Technology Zones, and Neom signed a Memorandum of Understanding to facilitate collaboration and legislation in support of Neom's Future Factories Program.

As of January 2023, Neom has not provided any information regarding how the complex will remain afloat.

Trojena 
On 3 March 2022, Saudi Crown Prince Mohammed bin Salman launched the Trojena project, which will be the first major outdoor skiing destination in the Arabian Peninsula. Although it is in the desert, the site's climate is considerably cooler than the rest of Neom's territory. Ennismore announced as inaugural partner with its brands 25hours Hotels and Morgans Originals.

Sindalah 
In December 2022, Neom announced plans for Sindalah, a  luxury resort complex off the city coast. It is planned to have an 86 berth marina, three luxury hotels, and could accommodate up to 2,400 visitors daily.

Agriculture 

Utilities 
Enowa, renewable energy, green hydrogen, zero waste desalination.

International relations
In March 2020, Neom signed a partnership deal as a principal partner with Mercedes-EQ Formula E Team. Two years later, Neom became the title sponsor for McLaren Racing's electric motorsport division as NEOM McLaren Electric Racing from the 2022–23 season with McLaren's Formula E and Extreme E divisions renamed as NEOM McLaren Formula E Team and NEOM McLaren Extreme E Team respectively.

In July 2020, the USA's Air Products & Chemicals Inc announced that it would build the world's largest green hydrogen plant in Saudi Arabia. Air Products will jointly own the US$5 billion project, along with Saudi Arabia's ACWA Power and Neom. 

In March 2021, Neom signed a four-year global sponsorship agreement with the Asian Football Confederation.

In 2022, Neom hosted Extreme E's 2022 Desert X-Prix and held the naming rights to the series' Island X-Prix in Sardinia.

In May 2022, Indian conglomerate Larsen & Toubro was awarded the contract for construction of a 2,930 MW solar power generation plant, a 1,370 MW wind power farm, a 400 MW battery energy storage system, along with a power transmission network of around 190 km.

In October 2022, Trojena was announced as the future host of the 2029 Asian Winter Games.

Controversies

Evictions and executions
It is estimated that 20,000 people will be forced to relocate to accommodate the planned city. The Howeitat tribe, who are native to the area, say that they are not opposed to the city itself, but rather the forced expulsion and subsequent violence. 

On 13 April 2020, activist Abdul Rahim al-Huwaiti posted videos online announcing that Saudi security forces were trying to evict him and other members of the Howeitat tribe from their historical homeland to make way for the development of Neom. In the videos, Abdul Rahim al-Huwaiti said he would defy the eviction orders, though he expected Saudi authorities would plant weapons in his house to incriminate him. He was later shot and killed by Saudi security forces, who claimed he had opened fire on them. London-based human rights activist and fellow Howeitat tribe member, Alya Alhwaiti disputed this version of events, stating he did not own firearms. His funeral was held near the village of al-Khoraibah and was well attended, despite the presence of Saudi security forces. Eight cousins of Abdul Rahim al-Huwaiti have been arrested for protesting against the eviction order, however Alya Alhwaiti said that she and other human rights activists hoped to challenge the arrests.

In June 2020, Mohammed bin Salman signed a $1.7 million contract with US public relations and lobbying firm Ruder Finn to counter the criticism and controversies around the Neom city project.

In November 2020, British lawyers representing the Howeitat tribe urged Dominic Raab to boycott the G20 Summit in Saudi Arabia, arguing that Britain has a moral imperative to take a stand in defense of the tribe and confront Saudi Arabia over its human rights issues.

In October 2022, the Specialized Criminal Court of Saudi Arabia sentenced three members of the Howeitat tribe to death for resisting displacement. The three men were arrested in 2020 for opposing the eviction of their tribe for the project. One of the condemned men, Shadli al-Howeiti, was the brother of Abdul Rahim al-Howeiti.

2029 Asian Winter Games 
In October 2022, Neom was announced as the host of the 2029 Asian Winter Games, a decision which received criticism concerning its adverse environmental impact. Amidst increasing global warming concerns, the project raised multiple issues ranging from the expected high temperatures in the desert land, the energy impact, and detour of local water resources to the construction of artificial ski slopes from scratch. Raphael Le Magoariec, a political scientist and specialist in the geopolitics of sports in the Gulf nations said that Riyadh “mainly wants to promote its city of the future”. The secretary general of the International Ski and Snowboard Federation, Michel Vion, expressed surprise at the decision of the Olympic Council of Asia (OCA) and Olympic downhill silver medalist, Johan Clarey said, “it is awful for our sport."

Abusive work culture 
In 2022, former employees reported CEO of the NEOM project, Nadhmi Al-Nasr, for promoting a management culture that "belittled expatriates, made unrealistic demands, and neglected discrimination in the workplace." The resignation letter of a former chief executive, Andrew Wirth, accused Nasr’s leadership of being "consistently inclusive of disparagement and inappropriately dismissive and demeaning outbursts". Nasr, appointed by Prince Mohammed with the responsibility to lead NEOM, was accused in his tenure of berating and scaring his employees, as confirmed by present and former staff members. Two gigaprojects under the Saudi Vision 2030 were merged in 2022, while the remaining three projects lost their expatriate chief executives and turned over the senior management.

The Saudi government refused to comment, while Neom declined to make Nasr available for answers or interview requests. However, Neom issued a written statement in defense of Nasr and the management culture at the megaproject, asserting that Neom represented "a scale and ambition the world has never seen before" and that it continued to retain and attract more talent because "employees are passionate about what they do and deeply committed to living up to, and delivering on, the Neom vision." Anthony Harris, a former director of innovation at Neom's education team, said the crown prince Mohammed bin Salman of a faulty workplace culture since "Nadhmi takes his cue from his boss, and everyone else at Neom takes their cue from Nadhmi." At one company meeting, Nasr said on record, "I drive everybody like a slave, when they drop down dead, I celebrate. That’s how I do my projects." He also threatened to replace employees stuck in other countries during the Covid-19 pandemic lockdown in 2020, which included the former director of branding and marketing.

In late 2018, Neom's progress suffered after the assassination of Jamal Khashoggi. Advisers to Neom, including  Daniel L. Doctoroff and architect Norman Foster, were reported to have distanced themselves from the project and the "toxic" Saudi crown prince.

Surveillance 

The Line, a smart city housed within Neom that has been aimed to be designed with the help of artificial intelligence, announced plans to use data as a currency to manage and provide facilities such as, power, waste, water, healthcare, transport and security. It was said that data would also be collected from the smartphones of the residents, their homes, facial recognition cameras and multiple other sensors. According to Joseph Bradley, the chief executive of Neom Tech & Digital Co., the data sweep would help developers feed the collected information to the city for further predicting and customizing every user's needs.

However, Saudi Arabia's poor human rights record and use of espionage and surveillance technology for spying on its citizens, invading their privacy and security, emerged as a roadblock in the situation, according to digital rights experts. A researcher of the social impacts of technology, Vincent Mosco stated, “the surveillance concerns are justified” while further adding that “it is, in effect, a surveillance city”.

The Saudi Ministry of Communications and Information Technology did not respond to digital rights experts and researchers' requests for comments.

Other criticisms 
In July 2020, a sponsorship with the League of Legends European Championship gathered significant backlash from the professional League of Legends community, including gamers and the league's staff. The backlash was centered around human rights abuses from the Saudi government, particularly its record on LGBT rights. As a result of the backlash, the sponsorship was cancelled within several hours of the announcement.

Mohammed bin Salman's vision for the city incorporates some technologies that do not currently exist, like flying cars, robot maids, dinosaur robots, and a giant artificial moon.

Some of the illustrations for the Neom project were taken from the  Gardens by the Bay in Singapore, leaving commentators to note that "using an actual shot of Singapore to depict an upcoming construction project in Saudi Arabia is an odd choice".

See also

 Ecological urbanism
 Megacity
 King Abdullah Economic City
 Red Sea Project
 Masdar City
 Qiddiya
 New Murabba

References

External links

 

2017 establishments in Saudi Arabia
Planned cities in Saudi Arabia
Populated places in Tabuk Province
Proposed populated places
Proposed special economic zones
Economy of Saudi Arabia
Public Investment Fund